The Autopista A1, also known as Autopista Nacional, is a Cuban motorway, partly built, that will link Havana to Guantánamo. Along with the Autopista A4, linking Havana to Pinar del Río, it is classified as part of the whole Autopista Nacional route, spanning the length of the island; as the Carretera Central highway.

History
The motorway, connected to the A4 via the Havana Ringroad (A2), was opened in 1979 from Havana to Santa Clara. Additional sections (2 in the Oriental region) were opened during the 1980s, but further work was interrupted in 1990 as the economic crisis of the "Special Period" developed.

Route

The A1, the longest motorway of the island, is a dual carriageway with 6 lanes (8 from Havana to San José de las Lajas), and has some at-grade intersections with rural roads. The operating sections are the Havana-Santa Clara-Sancti Spíritus-Taguasco (354 km, main section), Palma Soriano-Santiago de Cuba (53 km) and La Maya-Guantánamo (41 km, sharing the Carretera Central route for 9 km).

From the exit "Santa Clara-Manicaragua" to Taguasco, the A1 operates with a single carriageway, and from Taguasco to Jatibonico, it is under construction. Other sections under construction, both in Santiago de Cuba Province, are the one from Contramaestre to Palma Soriano, and the one from La Maya to the Palma-Santiago section, ending with the construction of a future interchange. The other section, passing through the provinces of Ciego de Ávila, Camagüey, Las Tunas, Holguín and Granma, has been planned.

See also

Roads in Cuba
Transport in Cuba
Infrastructure of Cuba

References

External links

A1
Transport in Havana
Mayabeque Province
Matanzas Province
Cienfuegos Province
Villa Clara Province
Sancti Spíritus Province
Ciego de Ávila Province
Camagüey Province
Las Tunas Province
Holguín Province
Granma Province
Santiago de Cuba Province
Guantánamo Province